Star Wars: Duel of the Fates (also known as Star Wars: Episode IX – Duel of the Fates) was the original draft of the third film in the Star Wars sequel trilogy. Named after the franchise's musical composition of the same name, the script was written in 2016 by Colin Trevorrow and Derek Connolly while Trevorrow was attached as director. After Trevorrow left the project in 2017, it was replaced with a script by J. J. Abrams and Chris Terrio that became 2019's Star Wars: The Rise of Skywalker, although the film retained modified ideas from Duel of the Fates.

A draft of the script of Duel of the Fates was leaked online in January 2020, shortly after the release of The Rise of Skywalker. It garnered attention due to The Rise of Skywalkers polarizing reception, and inspired fan-made adaptations.

Plot

Several years after the events of The Last Jedi, the First Order rules the galaxy with General Hux as its chancellor. Taking control of Coruscant, the First Order daily publicly executes members of a crushed Resistance and has blocked communications across the galaxy. Still free from the First Order's control, Rey, Finn, Poe Dameron, Rose Tico and BB-8 steal a Star Dreadnought from the occupied planet of Kuat and take it to Korilev, where surviving members of the Resistance, led by General Leia Organa, have established a new base.

Kylo Ren discovers a Sith holocron in Darth Vader's castle on Mustafar, which leads him to seek the training of a 7000-year-old alien named Tor Valum, who taught Emperor Palpatine's master Darth Plagueis. During his training, Kylo fights a phantom of Vader and masters the power to absorb life energy, which he uses to kill Tor Valum. Meanwhile, Rey learns from Jedi texts that the old Jedi Temple on Coruscant contains a device which can restore galactic communications. Finn, Rose, R2-D2, and C-3PO go to Coruscant to find the device, while Rey, Chewbacca, and Poe go to Bonadan in order to find the location of the planet Mortis, as Rey has seen a vision of herself dueling Kylo there. Leia convinces Lando Calrissian and his smugglers to join the Resistance for an attack on Coruscant.

On Coruscant, Finn and Rose find and activate the device, which should allow Leia to inspire rebellion across the galaxy, but they are found by First Order troops. Rose is captured, but Finn manages to escape: he fights a stormtrooper designated RK-514, and spares his life after defeating him. RK-514 sides with Finn, and they convince other First Order stormtroopers to defect as well. Meanwhile, on Bonadan, Rey, Poe and Chewbacca succeed in locating Mortis, but they are attacked by Kylo's Knights of Ren. They succeed in defeating the Knights, but Rey instinctively uses Force lightning to kill one of the Knights after she remembers that they were the ones who killed her parents, and fears that she is in danger of falling to the dark side. Fearing for her friends' safety, Rey departs for Mortis alone, while Poe and Chewbacca return to the Resistance base.

On Coruscant, Finn leads a revolution against the First Order's forces with the help of droids, citizens, and the defected stormtroopers, while Leia, Poe, Chewbacca, Lando, and a Resistance army arrive to join the fight. When the First Order is ultimately defeated, Hux kills himself with a purple-bladed lightsaber. After escaping from captivity, Rose rewires the hyperdrive of the First Order's capital ship, causing it to crash above Coruscant when it attempts to escape.

On Mortis, Rey finds Kylo and battles him, but he blinds and nearly kills her. Luke Skywalker's Force spirit offers moral support to Rey, and she confronts Kylo for a second time. Rey says her masters were wrong to reject the dark side and embraces both, allowing her to defeat Kylo. Kylo attempts to kill Rey by draining her life energy, but Leia manages to contact him through the Force and convinces him to stop. As a result, he transfers his own life energy to Rey instead, healing her and saving her life at the cost of his own. Before Kylo dies, his last words reveal Rey's true birth name to be Rey Solana. On the verge of death, Rey meets with the spirits of Luke, Yoda, and Obi-Wan Kenobi, who allow her to choose between staying dead or returning to life. 

Finn, Poe, Rose, and Chewbacca receive medals at the Resistance base. Finn and Rose settle on Modesta, where they raise Force-sensitive children. Rey arrives at their homestead and vows to teach the children about the Force and how the balance of light and dark will maintain galactic peace.

Development
In August 2015, Colin Trevorrow was announced as the director of Episode IX; he wrote a script titled Duel of the Fates with frequent collaborator Derek Connolly. The draft dated December 2016 would have required changes due to the death of actress Carrie Fisher (who played Leia Organa) the same month. The script draft was leaked online in January 2020 (while The Rise of Skywalker was in theaters). A number of Twitter users expressed that they would have preferred to see Trevorrow's Duel of the Fates over The Rise of Skywalker, which was written by J. J. Abrams and Chris Terrio. Major differences featured in Duel of the Fates are that Rey—who has the last name Solana—is not related to Palpatine (Darth Sidious), Kylo Ren seeks to be trained by Sith Master Tor Valum (who was going to be revealed as the master of Darth Plagueis), and the final battle centers upon the previously established planets Coruscant from the prequel trilogy and Mortis from The Clone Wars animated series. Other differences include that Rey is blinded by an unredeemed Kylo Ren, Luke's spirit has a more significant role, and R2-D2 suffers severe damage. The R2-D2 scene is the only one which Trevorrow has officially commented on, noting on Twitter that the droid would have been repaired. As part of an online Comic-Con event, Trevorrow called his departure from the film "traumatic" and showed a spaceship model, called a TIE marauder, he designed with his son for the unmade film. 

Some story elements survived in The Rise of Skywalker, notable examples including Kylo finding a Sith holocron in Darth Vader's castle on Mustafar and the transference of Force energy, and Rey using Force Lightning against an enemy.

While an initially reluctant Lando helping save the day by surprisingly arriving leading a fleet of spaceships made it into the final film, in Duel of the Fates, Lando was originally going to be introduced as enjoying a life of luxury by owning a cabaret bar. The views of Lando's portrayer Billy Dee Williams aligned with that more than was ultimately made, as he stated that due to Lando's gambling backstory, he imagined old Lando as a rich "Las Vegas entrepreneur and showman like Steve Wynn", and that he favored that to the military general side of Lando. The cabaret bar was replaced with Lando being on exile on a desert planet, which was noted as less what people would expect from Lando by Screen Rant. Entertainment Weekly noted that Lando would have made sense in the planet of casinos depicted in The Last Jedi. Director Rian Johnson considered placing Lando in the scene and returning him to his morally ambiguous roots, by having him betray the heroes again, but ultimately replaced him by creating the less moral character of DJ.

According to the website Polygon, the desert planet where Lando was found was the final addition to the film, as noted in its officially written artbook by Phil Szostak. In regards to the unmade Duel of the Fates script, the artbook noted only a few images related to the unfilmed script made it to the book, and that it did not even list Trevorrow's name among the main creative forces of the film. It also described the leaked Duel of the Fates concept art as coming from earlier drafts.

A TIE fighter Echelon ship statue survived in the Disney theme park Star Wars: Galaxy's Edge, the ship was developed by Colin Trevorrow during his work on Episode IX before being replaced as the film's director.

Reception 
The draft gained attention due to the mixed response of The Rise of Skywalker. Upon release, The Rise of Skywalker was criticized for revealing its lack of a plan connecting the sequel trilogy (most notably retconning events of The Last Jedi), its plot holes (Palpatine's return and his relationship to Rey being the most prominent), and its treatment of minority and female characters, particularly Rose Tico, Poe Dameron, and Finn. Actress Kelly Marie Tran's screentime as Rose was reduced from 10 minutes in The Last Jedi to less than two minutes in The Rise of Skywalker, while Poe's new backstory as a smuggler was seen as racist towards Latinos due to him being portrayed by Guatemalan-born actor Oscar Isaac. Finn's actor, John Boyega, also criticized the film for sidelining characters played by people of color, including him, Tran, and Isaac. Eliana Dokterman, writing for Time magazine, called the film and its retcons "problematic", perceiving Abrams' choices as having been made to appease the complaints leveled by a toxic contingent of online fandom angered by The Last Jedi, in particular online trolls who harassed Johnson and several cast members, most notably Tran. The Rise of Skywalker is tied with The Phantom Menace as the lowest-rated live-action Star Wars film on Rotten Tomatoes and the second-lowest behind The Phantom Menace on Metacritic. Screen Rant ranked it as the worst live-action film and Entertainment Weekly ranked it the worst Star Wars film.

Before the draft was revealed as real, Esquire described it as too good to be fan-fiction, calling the script "worldclass", and in contrast criticized The Rise of Skywalker as cowardly for not killing any main character, other than Palpatine, "the old man that was already dead", and Ben Solo whom he deemed "irredeemable from the start". Nerdist notes that Rey remained a nobody, as compared to making her a Palpatine, which completely undermined the meaning of The Last Jedi. Inverse states that Duel of the Fates has two massive flaws in its roles for Leia and her son, Kylo Ren. However, Inverse praised the discarded script for multiple reasons, including being darker and less reliant on nostalgia and retcons than the final film, as well as connecting better to The Force Awakens due to providing an actual explanation for Rey's visions of the Knights of Ren, which Inverse also praised for providing better reasons for Rey to shoot Force Lightning. The Duel of the Fates script treated such ability as Rey's Dark Side powers being triggered by her realizing the Knights of Ren killed her parents, rather than the final film's treatment which turned it into a hereditary skill, something no previous film had done. 

Collider made a video review of the unmade script and opined in April 2021 that Star Wars parody Spaceballs was better than The Rise of Skywalker. According to CBR.com the unmade script was heavily political somewhat beyond Finn's plotline, noting it sought to explain how the social class worked in the franchise (continuing from The Last Jedi), and comparing the themes to contemporary films like Us and the Oscar-winning film Parasite. It noted in the opening act that migrants helped the First Order due to financial bankruptcy, and that the communications blockade was a parallel for censorship. It also compared the stormtroopers' conditioning to imperialism, in the sense that indigenous children have always been forced to forget their cultures and native languages in re-education camps. CBR.com called Disney and Abrams cowards for depoliticizing the ultimately made film. The website later published a detailed opinion on why the unmade script would had been better than the one Abrams rewrote, calling most of the unmade arcs better including those of Rey, Hux, Kylo Ren (as the main villain), Luke Skywalker, Rose Tico, and Finn.

Some websites perceived Trevorrow's unmade script as closely aligned with the themes of the previous films of the saga, mainly The Last Jedi, and some also perceived it as giving other star characters more to do. John Boyega concurred with this, stating that the released film by Terrio and Abrams denied him of the "big hero moment" that the unmade film intended for his character, for instance when he leads an army into battle against the First Order holding a Rebellion flag, which was developed as concept art. Finn was also going to convince stormtroopers to defect the First Order and lead them into battle against it. The concept art of Finn's speech while holding the flag, as well as dialogue from the unmade film, were shared on social media and compared very positively and paralleling a speech given by Boyega during the 2020 Black Lives Matter protests. In November 2020, Boyega revealed that the controversy surrounding the diminished roles of the characters played by people of color in The Rise of Skywalker led him to have a "very honest conversation" with Lucasfilm president Kathleen Kennedy, who supported his claims. Boyega also said he would like to see Duel of the Fates adapted into a television series, particularly an animated one. Some sources have suggested that aspects of the script could be incorporated into other future Star Wars media. A filmed deleted scene from The Last Jedi Blu-ray showed a similar plotline where Finn caused a stormtrooper revolt against Captain Phasma; some websites felt the scene should have been kept in the final film.

Various media sources have compared the unmade script and the controversy surrounding it to Zack Snyder's Justice League, a director's cut representing Snyder's original vision before he had to step away from the production and it was reworked for theatrical release by Joss Whedon. The failed course correction attempt was also compared to the ones of the James Bond films Diamonds Are Forever and No Time to Die,  which were well-received upon release. BBC compared the controversy to the one surrounding the Game of Thrones ending, and the female Ghostbusters, being negative about Abrams' choices. The Simpsons made an episode titled Do Pizza Bots Dream of Electric Guitars where the plot was about Homer Simpson and Comic Book Guy trying to prevent Abrams from doing a film featuring characters from Homer's childhood. Shortly after the release of The Rise of Skywalker, a rumor was circulated concerning an alleged "Abrams cut" of the film, which was quickly debunked. A subsequent unsubstantiated rumor claimed that George Lucas would release his own version of The Rise of Skywalker even though he had no involvement with the making of the film. Filmaker , Youtube film pundit and Star Wars fan Robert Meyer Burnett analysed the script on his Youtube channel feeling the script had some superior ideas to those put on-screen in Star Wars: The Rise of Skywalker.

Adaptations

Fan-made comic adaptation
Graphic artist Andrew Winegarner produced a comic version of the script in March 2021. The fan-made comic adaptation of the unmade script is 7 parts long, and its author shared it for free on his website. IGN noted that the author stated that he adapted the unmade script due to his disappointment over how The Rise of Skywalker deviated from expectations that had been set up by the first two films of the sequel trilogy, and was a "retread of Return of the Jedi." He also noted the unmade script was not fan fiction because Trevorrow received credit as a writer in The Rise of Skywalker. CinemaBlend was positive about the fan-made comic, having opined in January 2020 that Lucasfilm should adapt the unmade script into a comic, along the lines of The Star Wars, which adapted the original unmade script of the original Star Wars film (1977). Inverse was positive about the fan-made comic adaptation while noting that the opinion that an unmade version of a film would have been better is common when the officially released version of the work was negatively received. He also compared the comic to the Star Wars Infinities comics, which told alternate stories to the ones of the films.

Fan-made animated adaptationsDuel of the Fates also received a fan-made animated parody adaptation on the YouTube channel Mr Sunday Movies. Inverse was positive about the parody, noting that it was more of a comedic overview of the details of the unmade script, rather than a serious adaptation. Another website, Digital Spy, compared the style of the animation drawings to the one of Nintendo's video game The Legend of Zelda: Link's Awakening.CinemaBlend'' was positive about the fan-made parody adaptation, and in another article noted that another different, and more serious animated adaptation existed by another YouTube channel, adapting a single scene of Kylo Ren talking to the ghost of Luke Skywalker in the ruins of Darth Vader's castle.

Notes

References

External links
 Andrew Winegarner's unofficial comic adaptation

Unproduced screenplays
Star Wars